Soisy is the name or part of the name of four communes of France:
Soisy-Bouy in the Seine-et-Marne département
Soisy-sous-Montmorency in the Val-d'Oise département
Soisy-sur-École in the Essonne département
Soisy-sur-Seine in the Essonne département